Below is a list of notable footballers who have played for Steaua București. Generally, this means players that have played 100 or more Liga I matches for the club. However, some players who have played fewer matches are also included: this includes some players who did not reach the 100 games but made significant contributions to the club's history and performances. Numbers below indicate national championship appearances for Steaua.

Key to positions

Notable players
Appearances and goals adds from Steaua's official book.Updated 17 June 2022.

(*) Still playing for Steaua

Gallery

References

Players
Lists of association football players by club in Romania
 
Association football player non-biographical articles